Pythium perniciosum is a plant pathogen infecting strawberries and poinsettias.

References

External links
 Index Fungorum
 USDA ARS Fungal Database

Water mould plant pathogens and diseases
Water mould strawberry diseases
Ornamental plant pathogens and diseases
perniciosum
Species described in 1912